Ancylosis muliebris is a species of snout moth in the genus Ancylosis. It was described by Edward Meyrick in 1937 from Iraq but is also found in North Macedonia.

References

Moths described in 1937
muliebris
Moths of Europe
Moths of Asia